Save the Pine Bush is a not-for-profit community group which came into being on February 6, 1978. Its mission is to stop development of the Albany Pine Bush in the Capital District of the U.S. state of New York. Today the group continues to be an active environmental community.

Mainly through litigation, Save the Pine Bush has prevented or delayed the construction of several developments in the Pine Bush.

References

External links
Save the Pine Bush

Environmental organizations based in New York (state)